Zaramo is a Niger-Congo language, formerly primary language of the Zaramo people of eastern Tanzania. Zaramo is also known as Zalamo, Kizaramo, Dzalamo, Zaramu, Saramo and, Myagatwa. The language is critically endangered. The ethnic population of the Zaramo people reaches about 200,000, yet there are only a few elderly speakers remaining.

These speakers are mostly located in the villages surrounding the city of Dar es Salaam. Zaramo is thought to be passed down matrilineally to the children in these villages, while it remains critically endangered in the city.

There are very few translations of the language in existence except for a few native speakers' documented translations, and the publication of the New Testament from 1975.

Classification 
Zaramo is genetically tied to the Niger-Congo language family. It is classified under the Atlantic-Congo, Volta-Congo, Benue-Congo, Bantoid, Southern, Narrow Bantu, Central, G, and Zigula-Zaramo families. (G.33)

History 
Zaramo is the official language of a Bantu tribe located in the coastal area surrounding the former capital city of Tanzania, Dar es Salaam. Linguistic evidence supports the theory that Zaramo originated from the Luguru tribe. A migration of the Zaramo people eastward from their original location in Tanzania has been the source of slight changes in their cultural language.

The Zaramo as they are known today are made up of clans that migrated from the Kutu and the Luguru around 1700. Their common ancestry with the Luguru is substantiated, in that they have the same common language with only slight dialectal variations. The language of the Zaramo is mutually intelligible with those of the Jutu, the Luguru, the Kwere, and the Kami. Most Zaramo people of today chose to speak the lingua franca of Tanzania.

While the ethnic population of the Zaramo people reaches about 200,000, today there are only a few elderly speakers of Zaramo language. Most Zaramo people speak Swahili as their first language today and have adopted Swahili-Arabic names. They favor the Swahili over their endangered dialect for its broad use in communication and trade.

Geographic Distribution

Official Status 
Zaramo is not the official language of any country or region. Currently, the only locations where Zaramo still exists is Pwani region of eastern Tanzania. This area is located between two cities - Bagamoyo and Dar es Salaam. The rural, costal area is home to the Zaramo people who are the only ethnic group to speak the language.

Dialects Varieties 
There are no known dialects of Zaramo. It shares a lexical similarity: 68% with Kutu [kdc], 65% with Kami [kcu], 61% with Kwere [cwe] and Doe [doe]. This connection is substantiated by the historical relationship between the tribes.

Examples 
There are very few examples of Zaramo language available. A list of words and phrases was provided by a native speaker to the author of Short Specimens of the Vocabularies of Three Unpublished African Languages: Gindo, Zaramo, and Angazidja.

Writing System 
The Zaramo language uses latin script for its writing system. Latin script is the most widely used writing system in the world. Some languages adapted the alphabet by the addition of entirely new letters such Zaramo, and other languages from the Niger-Congro orthographies.

See also 
 Zaramo people
 Languages of Tanzania
 Zaramo Ethnologue

References

Biblig 

Northeast Coast Bantu languages
Languages of Tanzania